Charles de Gaulle is the flagship of the French Navy. The ship, commissioned in 2001, is the tenth French aircraft carrier, the first French nuclear-powered surface vessel, and the only nuclear-powered carrier completed outside of the United States Navy. She is named after French president and general Charles de Gaulle.

The ship carries a complement of Dassault Rafale M and E-2C Hawkeye aircraft, AS365F Dauphin Pedro, EC725 Caracal and AS532 Cougar helicopters for combat search and rescue, as well as modern electronics and Aster missiles. She is a CATOBAR-type carrier that uses two 75 m C13‑3 steam catapults of a shorter version of the catapult system installed on the US  aircraft carriers, one catapult at the bow and one across the front of the landing area. As of July 2021, Charles de Gaulle is the only non-American carrier-vessel that has a catapult launch system, which has allowed for operation of F/A-18E/F Super Hornets and C-2 Greyhounds of the US Navy.

Development

Construction
The carrier replaced , a conventionally powered aircraft carrier, in 2001.  and Foch were completed in 1961 and 1963 respectively; the requirement for a replacement was identified in the mid-1970s.

The hull was laid down in April 1989 at the DCNS Brest naval shipyard. The carrier was launched in May 1994 and at 42,000 tonnes (full load) was the largest warship launched in Western Europe since  in 1950. She was to be named Richelieu in 1986 by the French president at the time, François Mitterrand, after the famous French statesman Armand-Jean du Plessis, Cardinal Richelieu. On 18 May 1987, however, the name of the ship was changed to Charles de Gaulle by the Gaullist Prime Minister at the time, Jacques Chirac.

Construction quickly fell behind schedule as the project was starved of funding, which was worsened by the economic recession in the early 1990s. Total costs for the vessel would top €3 billion. Work on the ship was suspended altogether on four occasions: 1990, 1991, 1993, and 1995. The ship was commissioned on 18 May 2001, five years behind the projected deadline.

In 1993, it was alleged by The Guardian that a group of engineers inspecting the vessel during her construction were British Secret Intelligence Service (MI6) operatives, believed to have been learning the method of shielding the nuclear reactors, amongst other technical details. However, the newspaper published a denial by both the British government and the Direction de la surveillance du territoire (DST) (in English: Directorate of Territorial Surveillance) that there had been any incident.

Trials and technical problems

Charles de Gaulle entered sea trials in 1999. These identified the need to extend the flight deck to safely operate the E-2C Hawkeye. This operation sparked negative publicity, however, as the same tests had been conducted on both Foch and Clemenceau when the F-8E (FN) Crusader fighter had been introduced. The 5 million francs for the extension was 0.025% of the total budget for the Charles de Gaulle project. On 28 February 2000, a nuclear reactor trial triggered the combustion of additional isolation elements, producing a smoke incident.

The ship left Toulon for her fourteenth and final sea trial on 24 October 2000. During the night of 9–10 November, in the Western Atlantic while en route toward Norfolk, Virginia, the port propeller broke, and the ship had to return to Toulon to have a replacement fitted. The investigations that followed showed similar structural faults in the other propeller and in the spare propellers: bubbles in the one-piece copper-aluminium alloy propellers near the centre. Although the supplier, Atlantic Industrie, was not believed to have intentionally been at fault, it was nevertheless blamed for poor-quality construction. Not long after the French defense minister ordered an investigation on quality management, a fire destroyed the archives of the supplier. As a temporary solution, the less advanced spare propellers of Clemenceau were used, limiting the maximum speed to 25 knots (44 km/h) instead of the contractual 27 knots (50 km/h).

On 5 March 2001, Charles de Gaulle returned to sea with the ex-Clemenceau propellers and reached 25.2 knots (47 km/h) on her trials.

On 16 September 2001 the French press reported slightly higher than acceptable radioactivity levels aboard Charles de Gaulle, thought to be caused by a faulty isolation element. It was later discovered that the radioactivity levels matched the design, but that the regulations concerning acceptable radioactivity levels had changed. While the United States was preparing its response to the September 11 attacks in the form of Operation Enduring Freedom, French media complained about the lack of deployable French military power. At the same time, the Defence Commission reported the maintenance of the Fleet to be substandard. In this context, Charles de Gaulle, then under repairs, was again an object of criticism, with former President Valéry Giscard d'Estaing describing it as a "half-aircraft-carrier" and requesting the launching of the second carrier vessel (named PA2) to guarantee an availability rate of 100%.

Maintenance and upgrades
Charles de Gaulle first major overhaul began in September 2007. The highlight of this 15-month refit was the refueling of the nuclear power plant, a necessary step after six years in service, during which Charles de Gaulle sailed the equivalent of 12 times around the world, spent 900 days at sea, and performed 19,000 catapult launches. Several improvements were also made, including the installation of new propellers. Aircraft maintenance and weapons stores were also upgraded to allow the operation of new Rafale F3 fighters armed with ASMP-A nuclear missiles and SCALP EG cruise missiles, and satellite communications bandwidth will be increased tenfold. This refit increased displacement to 42500 tonnes and was completed in December 2008. After technical problems in March 2009, the carrier was back in Toulon for repairs. An intensive work-up period was planned to bring Charles de Gaulle and her air group back to operational status.

On 14 October 2010, a four-month cruise was cut down to a single day when the ship suffered an electrical fault in its propulsion system.

The aircraft carrier underwent an 18-month midlife upgrade and refit begun in February 2017 and returned to service in September 2018. The nuclear reactor was refueled, standard maintenance was completed, and the ship's combat system was modernized, to better communicate with allies and support the Rafale fighters employed by the carrier.

Operational service

On 11 October 2001, the frigate , four AWACS aircraft and Charles de Gaulle were involved in a successful trial of the Link 16 high-bandwidth secure data network. The network allows real-time monitoring of the airspace from the South of England to the Mediterranean Sea. The collected data were also transmitted in real-time to the frigate  through the older MIL-STD-6011 system.

Afghanistan 
On 21 November 2001, France decided to send Charles de Gaulle to the Indian Ocean in support of Operation Enduring Freedom against Taliban-controlled Afghanistan. Task Force 473, with 2,900 men under the command of Contre-Amiral François Cluzel, sailed on 1 December 2001.

Embarked air power comprised sixteen Super Étendards, one E-2C Hawkeye, two Rafale Ms and several helicopters. The Super Étendards carried out their first missions above Afghanistan on 19 December, executing reconnaissance and bombing missions, covering over 3,000 kilometres. Overall they carried out 140 missions, averaging 12 per day. Approximately 770 sorties were carried out from the carrier.

On 18 February 2002, a Helios observation satellite spotted abnormal activities near Gardez. The next day, after American Special Forces in the region confirmed these observations, Charles de Gaulle launched two reconnaissance Super Étendards. On 20 February 2002, British and US forces entered the valley and Operation Anaconda began in early March 2002.

In March 2002, Super Étendards and six land-based Mirage 2000 aircraft carried out airstrikes against targets claimed to be al Qaeda. A few targets suggested by U.S. forces were denied out of fear of hitting civilians. Nevertheless, French involvement was complimented on 11 March 2002 by US President George W. Bush, who mentioned "our good ally, France, has deployed nearly one-fourth of its navy to support Operation Enduring Freedom". At this point, the French air complement had been increased to 16 Super Étendards, 6 Mirage 2000 D, 5 Rafales, and two Hawkeye AWACS. From February 2002, the air wings of Charles de Gaulle and  landed on each other's decks as a means of strengthening the ties between the allies.

On 2 May 2002, Charles de Gaulle arrived in Singapore for relief, and returned to Oman on 18 May 2002.

Indian-Pakistani crisis 

In June 2002 while Charles de Gaulle was in the Arabian Sea, armed Rafale fighters conducted combat air-patrols with the United States Navy off the coast of India and Pakistan, marking a significant point in the Rafale M's operational career and its integration with the carrier.

Continuing operations 
Charles de Gaulle participated in further actions as part of Operation Enduring Freedom in 2005. She returned to Southwest Asia in May 2006 and shortly after supported coalition efforts over Afghanistan. The aircraft carrier regularly participates in the annual bilateral naval exercises between the Indian and French navies called 'Varuna'.

Fifth overseas deployment: Task Force 473 and Operation Agapanthus 2010 
A French naval task group, designated Task Force 473, led by Charles de Gaulle departed Toulon on 30 October 2010 for a four-month deployment, code-named Operation Agapanthus 2010, to the Mediterranean Sea, Red Sea, Indian Ocean, and Persian Gulf. The task group commander, Rear Admiral Jean-Louis Kerignard, defined force's mission as follows:

In December 2010, during its deployment to the Persian Gulf, the British Type 22 frigate  and the United States destroyer  rotated from maritime security patrol to escort Charles de Gaulle in support of coalition military operations in Afghanistan. This represented an example of interoperability pursuant to the recently ratified Anglo-French defence cooperation treaty.

Between 7–14 January 2011, Task Force 473 participated in bilateral naval exercises, code-named Varuna 10, with the Indian Navy. Varuna 10 was a two-phase naval exercise, with the harbor phase taking place between 7–11 January and the sea phase between 11 and 14 January in the Arabian Sea. Task Force 473 paid a port visit to Goa between 7–14 January 2011. The carrier Charles de Gaulle and the frigate Forbin also paid a goodwill visit to Khor Fakkan, United Arab Emirates, on 30 January 2011, docking at its container terminal facilities.

Operation Agapanthus 2010 concluded on 21 February 2011. Task Force 473 completed more than 1,000 flying hours flown from Charles de Gaulle in support of NATO's International Security Assistance Force (ISAF) deployed in Afghanistan. Task Force 473 also participated in bilateral exercises with armed forces of India, Saudi Arabia, and the United Arab Emirates to test the interoperability of French military forces and share expertise with the regional partners.

2011 Mediterranean operations 

On 20 March 2011, Charles de Gaulle was deployed to the Mediterranean Sea to enforce United Nations Security Council Resolution 1973 which called for a no-fly zone over Libya.

During Unified Protector, the air fleet had flown 1,350 sorties during the intervention in Libya. Charles de Gaulle was then withdrawn for maintenance at Toulon on 10 August.

Following this deployment, Charles de Gaulle underwent maintenance and upkeep during an at-sea underway period in December 2011.

2012 FANAL exercises 
On 2 February 2012, Charles de Gaulle was underway for three days of sea trials. Beginning on 5 February 2012, carrier qualifications began for the pilots of its air group. This included transitioning of pilots flying Super Étendard Modernisé (SEM) strike fighters to the new Rafale M fighters.

On 16 March 2012, Charles de Gaulle departed for a one-month deployment to the Mediterranean Sea. Charles de Gaulles embarked air group consisted of 7 Rafale fighters, 7 Super Étendards Modernisés (SEM) strike fighters, and 2 E-2C Hawkeye airborne early warning (AEW) aircraft. The highlight of the deployment for the task group was 2012 FANAL exercises that began on 5 April 2012 which also included land-based Atlantique 2 maritime patrol aircraft. 2012 FANAL concluded on 12 April, and this was the first major exercise involving the French Navy's new Caïman helicopter.

Operations against Islamic State 

In January 2015, Charles de Gaulle began being prepared for exercises in the Indian Ocean. In late February, the carrier and its battle group entered the Persian Gulf to participate in Opération Chammal against Islamic State militants in Iraq. France was the first country to join the American-led intervention and has 15 fighters, a patrol aircraft, and refueling aircraft based on land in neighboring countries. The addition of Charles de Gaulle added up to another 30 aircraft to France's commitment to operations. The carrier battle group arrived in the Persian Gulf on 15 February 2015 and began launching airstrikes on 22 February; this occurred seven weeks after the Charlie Hebdo attacks, as France vowed to be more responsive to jihadist terrorism. Sailing off the north coast of Bahrain, the carrier's 12 Rafale and 9 Super Étendard fighters could reach targets in half the time it would take French fighters based in the United Arab Emirates. Charles de Gaulle left the Persian Gulf in late-April 2015 after launching strike and surveillance missions against IS targets to participate in exercises with the Indian military; the carrier launched 10–15 sorties per day during its two-month deployment.

On 5 November 2015, France announced Charles de Gaulle would return to the area to conduct operations and the ship departed from its base in Toulon, southern France, on 18 November. Although originally planned to redeploy to the Persian Gulf, the carrier and its strike group was re-routed to the Eastern Mediterranean Sea off the Syrian coastline, much closer to targets within Syria. Sources claim Charles de Gaulle has a larger than normal air wing of 26 fighters consisting of 18 Rafales and 8 Super Étendards; the carrier has approximately 31–34 aircraft total (the official limit is 40 aircraft). The carrier began operations on 23 November 2015, 10 days after the ISIL terrorist attacks in Paris. On 7 December 2015, Rear Admiral René-Jean Crignola of the French Maritime Force, embarked in Charles de Gaulle, took command of U.S. Naval Forces Central Command's Task Force 50, leading coalition naval strike operations. He was the first non-American to do so. In June 2016, the United States Navy awarded the crew of the Charles de Gaulle a Meritorious Unit Commendation for its accomplishments.

In late September 2016, Charles de Gaulle was deployed from Toulon to the Syrian coast for the Battle of Mosul. Its squadron of 24 Rafale M aircraft supported the international coalition against ISIL through airstrikes and reconnaissance missions.

In 2020, while continuing Opération Chammal in the Eastern Mediterranean, Charles de Gaulle was joined by the US Navy  . They joined forces on Operation Inherent Resolve, an international coalition against the Daesh. Throughout the mission, the carrier strike group was joined by allied navy vessels from Germany, Belgium, Denmark, Greece, Spain, the Netherlands and Portugal. The cooperation illustrated common operational efficiency in the Mediterranean. The President of Cyprus, Nicos Anastasiades, and ambassador Isabelle Dumont addressed the aircraft crew in the presence of Captain Guillaume Pinget.

Mission Clemenceau 
The aircraft carrier led the carrier strike group Task Force 473 on a five-month long operation that began in March 2019, through the Mediterranean Sea. Aircraft from Charles de Gaulle participated in the last major combat against the Islamic State in the Battle of Baghuz Fawqani and then sailed for the Indian Ocean. Arriving in Singapore on 28 May, the aircraft carrier participated in a bilateral exercise with the Singapore Armed Forces.

COVID-19 pandemic 

In April 2020, 40 crew members began to show symptoms of COVID-19, requiring Charles de Gaulle to return to her home port Toulon arsenal earlier than planned, as reported on 8 April by the Ministry of Armed Forces.

After 66 tests were conducted, the ministry announced on 10 April that 50 tests had returned positive.

On 19 April, The New York Times reported that 1,081 crew members in the carrier's naval group had tested positive, nearly all of which were on board Charles de Gaulle. The figure equated to nearly 60 percent of the carrier's total complement.

On 11 May 2020, Florence Parly reported to the National Assembly the conclusions of two investigations into the outbreak on board the carrier, stating that the virus had first arrived before a stopover made in Brest, and that although the command and medical team aboard the carrier had "excessive confidence" in their ability to deal with the virus, the investigations did not consider them at fault.

Parly further explained that the introduction of the virus on board the carrier happened sometime between when it left Limassol, Cyprus, on 26 February 2020, and when it arrived at Brest on 13 March 2020. During this time, personnel had been brought on board via air from either Cyprus, Sicily, the Balearic Islands, Spain, or Portugal. The spread of the virus, however, was exacerbated by the stopover at Brest. Social distancing and other measures were taken after the stopover, but they weighed heavily on crew morale, so after enforcing the strict measures for a fortnight, they were relaxed, and a concert on board was authorized for 30 March 2020.

Parly also noted that all soldiers aboard Charles de Gaulle have since recovered from the disease except for one sailor, who was still hospitalized after leaving the ICU.

Later analysis by physicians at the Military Instruction Hospital Sainte Anne in Toulon found that 60% of Charles de Gaulles 1,706 crewmembers were antibody-positive by the end of quarantine.

Clemenceau 21 
Charles de Gaulle led the carrier strike group (CSG), as part of the “Clemenceau 21” mission, which set sail on 21 February 2021. The CSG is deployed for several months to the Mediterranean Sea, then to the Indian Ocean and the Persian Gulf and is set to return to Toulon in June.

From 18 November to 2 December 2021, the Charles de Gaulle took part in Exercise POLARIS 21 in the western Mediterranean sea.

Clemenceau 22 
Charles de Gaulle set sail on 1 February leading the French Carrier Strike Group (CSG) to the Mediterranean as part of Clemenceau 22 from February to April 2022. This CSG consist of 1 Air defence Destroyer, Forbin (D620), 1 Air Defence Frigate, Alsace (D656), 1 Anti-Submarine Frigate, Normandie (D651), 1 Rubis-class SSN and 1 Durance-class replenishment oiler, Marne (A630). The CSG will be joined by other 3 other allies' ships and 1 submarine.

Carrier air group
The carrier air group operates three squadrons (11F, 12F, 17F) of fifteen Rafale M aircraft each, and one squadron (4f) of three E-2C Hawkeye aircraft. These are the:
Flottille 11F
Flottille 12F
Flottille 17F
Flottille 4F
Typically two Rafale squadrons are expected to rotate in the Charles de Gaulle carrier air group, and a pair of E-2Cs would supplement them. In peacetime, the number of aircraft on board may be lower: 30/40 Rafale M, 2 E-2C Hawkeye and 2/4 AS365 Dauphin helicopters. Although 30 Rafales, divided into two squadrons, are expected to be on board, usually some aircraft remain in France for upgrade or training. US Navy F-18 Hornets and C-2 Greyhounds regularly conduct qualification traps and launches from Charles de Gaulle. In June 2011, two US Navy C-2A(R) Greyhounds were assigned to the French Navy to conduct operational carrier on-board delivery (COD) missions for Charles de Gaulle during the NATO intervention in Libya.

In 2019, Charles de Gaulle operated 35 aircraft during exercises, its record: two Dauphin helicopters, thirty Rafale M, two E-2C Hawkeye and one NH90 NFH Caiman. In the event of war, the carrier is expected to operate close to its full complement of 40 aircraft. The air group took part in combat operations in Afghanistan, Syria and Libya.

French aircraft carrier procurement
 
The French Navy aimed to be a two-carrier navy, mainly to ensure that at least one ship is operational at all times even when the other is under repair. This scheme requires another aircraft carrier to be built; however, Charles de Gaulle is the only aircraft carrier currently serving.

Cost considerations have made equipment standardization a necessity. In this context, there is a possibility of collaboration with Britain for future aircraft carriers. Thales UK (with BMT) made the design for the  suitable for construction for France as the French aircraft carrier PA2. Steps were taken by both countries to make such a scenario possible: the new carrier had to be conventionally propelled to meet the requirements of the Royal Navy. France favoured nuclear propulsion, and a study was conducted to see if it was more cost-efficient than gas turbines. However, the 2013 French Defence White Paper cancelled the plan for a second carrier.

Following completion of the midlife upgrade, in October 2018 the French armed forces minister announced an 18-month study to determine the requirements for a future carrier. In December 2020, President Macron announced that construction of the New Generation Aircraft Carrier would begin in around 2025 with sea trials to start in about 2036. The carrier is planned to have a displacement of around 75,000 tons and to carry about 32 next-generation fighters, two to three E-2D Advanced Hawkeyes and a yet-to-be-determined number of unmanned carrier air vehicles.

See also
 List of aircraft carriers
 List of naval ship classes in service
 Mistral-class French helicopter carrier

Notes

References

Further reading

External links

  
 Charles de Gaulle aircraft carrier at Alabordache.fr 

Aircraft carriers of the French Navy
Ships built in France
1994 ships
Nuclear-powered ships
Aircraft carriers of France
Charles de Gaulle
French involvement in the Syrian civil war
Articles containing video clips
Aircraft carriers involved in the COVID-19 pandemic